Scandoromani is a North Germanic based Para-Romani. It is spoken by the Scandinavian Romanisæl Travellers, a Romani minority community, in Norway (c. 100–150 elderly speakers), and formerly in Sweden.

Subforms are referred to as:
 Traveller Norwegian (lit. 'Traveller's language')) Norwegian  (Norwegian Romani), in Norway;
 Tavringer Romani, Traveller Swedish or Tattare, Swedish  (Swedish Romani), in Sweden;
 Traveller Danish in Denmark.

Like Angloromani in Britain and Caló in Spain, Scandoromani draws upon a (now extinct) vocabulary of inflected Romani. Much of the original Romani grammar, however, has been lost to the users, and they now communicate in Swedish or Norwegian grammar.

There is no standardised form of Scandoromani, so variations exist in vocabulary, pronunciation, and usage, depending on the speaker. In print, Scandoromani words are often written with Swedish (S) or Norwegian (N) letters (ä, æ, ø, å) and letter combinations to represent Romani sounds, e.g., tj- or kj- ( alt. ) to represent the Romani č  and čh . Some examples of Scandoromani variant spellings are: tjuro (S) / kjuro (N) 'knife'; gräj (S) / grei (N) 'horse'.

See also 
 Finnish Kalo language
 Para-Romani

Notes

References

Suggested further reading 
 
 
 
 
 
  (A lexicon and grammatical overview of Tavringer Romani; includes several Traveller song texts in extenso)

External links 
  
 Norwegian Romani Dictionary 
 Examples of Tavringer Romani text from the websites of the Swedish Parliament and the Swedish Language Council 

Romani in Norway
Romani in Sweden
Romani in Denmark
Para-Romani
Languages of Norway
Languages of Sweden
Languages of Denmark
Mixed languages